Xiphidiopsis is a genus of bush crickets in the subfamily Meconematinae.  Species have been recorded from: India, China, Japan, Indochina, Malesia, and islands in the Indian Ocean and Pacific.

Species
The Orthoptera Species File currently lists five subgenera with Euxiphidiopsis restored here:
subgenus Bhuxiphidiopsis
Authority: Ingrisch, 2002; locality Tongsa, Bhutan
 Xiphidiopsis microstyla Ingrisch, 2002

subgenus Dinoxiphidiopsis
Authority: Gorochov, 1993; distribution: China and Vietnam
 Xiphidiopsis abnormalis (Gorochov & Kang, 2005)
 Xiphidiopsis bifurcatis Cui, Liu & Chang, 2020
 Xiphidiopsis expressa Wang, Liu & Li, 2015
 Xiphidiopsis fanjingshanensis Shi & Du, 2006
 Xiphidiopsis ikonnikovi (Gorochov, 1993)
 Xiphidiopsis jacobsoni Gorochov, 1993

subgenus Euxiphidiopsis
Authority: Gorochov, 1993; distribution: southern China and Indochina.

 Xiphidiopsis altiterga Sänger & Helfert, 1998
 Xiphidiopsis compacta Sänger & Helfert, 2004
 Xiphidiopsis damingshanensis (Shi & Han, 2014)
 Xiphidiopsis erromena (Shi & Mao, 2014)
 Xiphidiopsis eversmanni Gorochov, 1993
 Xiphidiopsis gurneyi Tinkham, 1944
 Xiphidiopsis haudlata Gorochov, 1994
 Xiphidiopsis impressa Bey-Bienko, 1962
 Xiphidiopsis lacusicerca Shi, Zheng & Jiang, 1995
 Xiphidiopsis motshulskyi Gorochov, 1993(type: locality Hà Sơn Bình, Vietnam)
 Xiphidiopsis nigrovittata Bey-Bienko, 1962
 Xiphidiopsis ovalis (Liu & Zhang, 2007)
 Xiphidiopsis platycerca Bey-Bienko, 1962
 Xiphidiopsis protensa Han, Chang & Shi, 2015
 Xiphidiopsis quadridentata (Liu & Zhang, 2000)
 Xiphidiopsis sinensis Tinkham, 1944
 Xiphidiopsis spathulata (Mao & Shi, 2007)
 Xiphidiopsis tonicosa Shi & Chen, 2002
 Xiphidiopsis triloba (Shi, Bian & Chang, 2011)

subgenus Paraxiphidiopsis Gorochov, 1993
 Xiphidiopsis zubovskyi Gorochov, 1993 (locality Tam Đảo National Park, Vietnam)

subgenus Xiphidiopsis
Authority: Redtenbacher, 1891

 Xiphidiopsis acuminata Jin, 2020
 Xiphidiopsis adelungi Gorochov, 1993
 Xiphidiopsis alatissima Karny, 1907
 Xiphidiopsis altiterga Sänger & Helfert, 1998
 Xiphidiopsis amnicola Gorochov, 1998
 Xiphidiopsis angustifurca Gorochov, 2011
 Xiphidiopsis anisolobula Han, Chang & Shi, 2015
 Xiphidiopsis anomala Kevan & Jin, 1993
 Xiphidiopsis autumnalis Gorochov, 1998
 Xiphidiopsis beybienkoi Gorochov, 1993
 Xiphidiopsis bicarinata Jin, 2020
 Xiphidiopsis bifoliata Shi & Zheng, 1995
 Xiphidiopsis bituberculata Ebner, 1939
 Xiphidiopsis borneensis Karny, 1925
 Xiphidiopsis brevifurca Gorochov, 2011
 Xiphidiopsis citrina Redtenbacher, 1891
 Xiphidiopsis compressa Jin, 2020
 Xiphidiopsis convexis Shi & Zheng, 1995
 Xiphidiopsis cyclolobia Karny, 1923
 Xiphidiopsis dicera Hebard, 1922
 Xiphidiopsis dichotoma Jin, 2020
 Xiphidiopsis dissita Gorochov, 1998
 Xiphidiopsis divida Shi & Zheng, 1995
 Xiphidiopsis drepanophora Hebard, 1922
 Xiphidiopsis elefan Gorochov, 2005
 Xiphidiopsis elongata Xia & Liu, 1993
 Xiphidiopsis excavata Xia & Liu, 1993
 Xiphidiopsis exigua Karny, 1926
 Xiphidiopsis fallax Redtenbacher, 1891type species (Malesia, various localities)
  Xiphidiopsis forficula Uvarov, 1923
  Xiphidiopsis greeni Uvarov, 1923
 Xiphidiopsis gressitti Jin, 2020
 Xiphidiopsis hebardi Karny, 1924
 Xiphidiopsis hwangi Bey-Bienko, 1962
 Xiphidiopsis impressa Bey-Bienko, 1962
 Xiphidiopsis inflata Shi & Zheng, 1995
 Xiphidiopsis jambi Gorochov, 2008
 Xiphidiopsis jinxiuensis Xia & Liu, 1990
 Xiphidiopsis kemneri Ander, 1937
 Xiphidiopsis kraussi Karny, 1924
 Xiphidiopsis lata Bey-Bienko, 1962
 Xiphidiopsis lita Hebard, 1922
 Xiphidiopsis maai Jin, 2020
 Xiphidiopsis mada Gorochov, 2016
 Xiphidiopsis malabarica Kevan & Jin, 1993
 Xiphidiopsis minorincisus Han, Chang & Shi, 2015
 Xiphidiopsis monstrosa Karny, 1924
 Xiphidiopsis nepalensis Kevan & Jin, 1993
 Xiphidiopsis ocellata Bey-Bienko, 1971
 Xiphidiopsis ornata Gorochov, 2019
 Xiphidiopsis padangi Gorochov, 2008
 Xiphidiopsis parallela Bey-Bienko, 1962
 Xiphidiopsis phetchaburi Gorochov, 1998
 Xiphidiopsis phyllocercus Karny, 1907
 Xiphidiopsis redtenbacheri Karny, 1924
 Xiphidiopsis sabahi Gorochov, 2008
 Xiphidiopsis sarawaka Bey-Bienko, 1971
 Xiphidiopsis shcherbakovi Gorochov, 2019
 Xiphidiopsis spoona Cui, Liu & Chang, 2020
 Xiphidiopsis straminula (Walker, 1871)
 Xiphidiopsis sulcata Xia & Liu, 1990
 Xiphidiopsis sumatrensis Karny, 1924
 Xiphidiopsis symmetrica Gorochov, 2011
 Xiphidiopsis tembelingi Gorochov, 2016
 Xiphidiopsis trifoliata Wang, Chen & Shi, 2019
 Xiphidiopsis trusmadi Gorochov, 2008
 Xiphidiopsis vernalis Gorochov, 1998

subgenus not assigned
 Xiphidiopsis compacta Sänger & Helfert, 2004
 Xiphidiopsis gracilis Sänger & Helfert, 2004
 Xiphidiopsis hoabinh Gorochov, 2005
 Xiphidiopsis jugata Gorochov, 2016
 Xiphidiopsis lampungi Gorochov, 2022
 Xiphidiopsis laosi Gorochov, 2022
 Xiphidiopsis madras Gorochov, 2005
 Xiphidiopsis subpunctata (Motschulsky, 1866)
 Xiphidiopsis tonicosa Shi & Chen, 2002

Zaxiphidiopsis
The species Zaxiphidiopsis bazyluki (Bey-Bienko, 1971), from Cúc Phương National Park, Hoa Binh Province, Vietnam, was elevated from subgenus Xiphidiopsis (Zaxiphidiopsis) bazyluki, to a new monotypic genus having originally been placed here.

References

External links

 Pictures at Cook Islands Biodiversity
 YouTube "Xiphidiopsis subpunctata"

Meconematinae
Tettigoniidae genera
Orthoptera of Asia